Tian Xian Pei, sometimes translated as Fairy Couple, is a Chinese legend that existed in oral tradition before any written versions. It has since become a major subject of several Chinese opera, films and TV series.

Story 
The seven daughters of the Jade Emperor travel to the mortal world.  The youngest of the seven fairy maidens was in search of her lost  weaving equipment and her "coat of feathers," without which she was unable to fly. Another version of the story states that the seventh fairy's feather coat was actually stolen by a mortal named Dong Yong, advised by one of his cattle who happened to be an exiled fairy as well and disguised as a normal, aged bull. During the stay, the maiden falls in love with Dong Yong. He is a poor worker who had sold himself into servitude to pay for his father's funeral. With help of the other fairies, the seventh fairy managed to weave ten pieces of brocade for Dong Yong to pay off his debt, shortening his indenture to 100 days.  Before the couple can begin their life together, the Jade Emperor orders his daughters to return home. However, he is kind enough to allow the couple to reunite once a year on the 七夕 (the 7th Evening) -- later known as the traditional Chinese Qixi Festival—by crossing the Milky Way.

In memory of this story, ancient Chinese astrologers named two prominent stars that stand at a distance from each other 牛郎, "cowherd man," and 織女, "weaving girl." These are the stars Altair in the constellation Aquila and Vega in Lyra.

Characters 
Dong Yong (董永)
The Seventh Fairy (七仙女)

Adaptations 
The story has been performed numerous times in Peking opera, Cantonese opera and other Chinese operas.

Films

Television series

Publications
The tale has also been subject matter of literary adaptations and retellings:

 
 The Seventh Fairy: a reinterpretation of the myth made by Angelo Paratico in a book published in Hong Kong in 2017 by Lascar Publishing.

See also 
 The Weaver Girl and the Cowherd
 Icarus
 Tanabata
 The Tale of the Bamboo Cutter (輝夜姬)
 The Fairy and the Woodcutter and Jaka Tarub and the Seven Apsaras, respectively a Korean and an Indonesian folktale similar to Tian Xian Pei.
 Pernikahan Nawangsih
 Ayashi no Ceres

References

Further reading
 Idema, Wilt L. Filial Piety and Its Divine Rewards: The Legend of Dong Yong and Weaving Maiden, with Related Texts. Indianapolis/Cambridge: Hackett, 2009. .

 
Love stories